F. Scott Fitzgerald's Way of Love is the second EP by South Korean boy band 2AM. It was released on March 12, 2012 with the song "I Wonder If You Hurt Like Me" as the title track.

Track listing

Charts

Album chart

Single chart

Other songs charted

References

External links 
 
 
 

2012 EPs
2AM (band) albums
JYP Entertainment EPs
Korean-language EPs
Hybe Corporation EPs